Humevale is a rural locality in Victoria, Australia,  north-east of Melbourne's Central Business District, located within the City of Whittlesea local government area. Humevale recorded a population of 352 at the 2021 census.

History

Located between Whittlesea and Kinglake West, Humevale was originally named Scrubby Creek, after a nearby watercourse. It was renamed Humevale in the 1920s by second-generation settlers, and was named after explorer Hamilton Hume, who explored nearby Mount Disappointment in 1824.

The area was originally worked by paling splitters and tenant farmers, who worked in the nearby Mount Disappointment range. In 1894, the area was subdivided into small farms and a village settlement, as part of a government closer settlement scheme. A number of orchards existed in the area until the 1930s, when they were replaced by livestock grazing.

The Post Office opened around 1902 as Scrubby Creek, was renamed Humevale in 1927, and closed in 1959. A school existed in the area from 1898 until 1968.

Transport

Bus
One bus route service Humevale:

 : Kinglake – Whittlesea via Humevale. Operated by Dysons.

References

External links
Gazetteer of Australia

Towns in Victoria (Australia)
City of Whittlesea